{{Infobox officeholder
| name = Tejaswini Gowda
| image = 
| caption = 
| birth_date =
| birth_place = Doddarayappanahalli-Kanivenarayanapura, Bangalore, Karnataka
| residence =Bangalore Rural
| death_date =
| death_place =
| office = Member of Legislative CouncilKarnataka
| constituency = Karnataka
| termstart = 18 July 2018
| office1  = Member of Parliament, Lok Sabha
| constituency1 = Kanakapura
| term1 = 2004-2009
| predecessor1 = H. D. Deve Gowda
| successor1 = D. K. Suresh (as MP for Bangalore Rural)
| party = Bharatiya Janata Party (since 2014)
| otherparty          = Indian National Congress (2004-2014)
| spouse = Sreeramesh
| children = 2
| website = http://tejasvinigowda.com/
| footnotes = 
| date = 6 April |
| year = 2009 |
| source = https://web.archive.org/web/20060622225933/http://164.100.24.208/ls/lsmember/biodata.asp?mpsno=4050 
}}

Dr. Tejaswini Gowda (born 11 November 1966) was a member of the 14th Lok Sabha (2004–2009) from Kanakapura in Karnataka (India), representing Congress Party. This seat morphed into Bangalore (Rural) seat, and she contested from the new seat in 2009 when she came third. In March 2014 she quit INC and joined BJP.

Early life and education
Tejaswini was born on 11 November 1966 to Muninanjappa and Munithayamma at Doddarayappanahalli,  in Bangalore Rural district. She holds a master's degree in Political Science and a bachelor's degree in Law from Vivekanda Law College, Bangalore. She is also a Philosophical Doctor from Bangalore University. She has a son and a daughter.

Life as a journalist
Before entering politics, Tejashwini was a research scholar and used to write on various aspects of life and society. She has also travelled into the tribal belts of Chhattisgarh and Bastar to produce television documentaries.

Her popularity among the crowds increased immensely after she started to host the chart show "Mukha Mukhi"'' (in Kannada it means face to face). Her popularity started to increase after she interviewed many political personalities. Her chat show was able to increase its popularity due to its content, which asked questions related to politician's inter-party squabbling and corruption.

Electoral performance
Taking the advantage of her popularity, before the 14th Loksabha elections in 2004, Tejashwini joined the Indian National Congress. She was given the ticket from the Congress party on the last day of nominations. She was able to win by a margin of over one lakh votes, defeating Bharatiya Janata Party's leader Ramachandra Gowda, and former PM Deve Gowda who came third in Kanakpura but won from the other seat (Hassan) which he had contested.
She was the candidate of INC from the Bangalore Rural Constituency in the General Elections 2009, and she came third behind the JD(S) and BJP candidates.

See also
Members of the Fourteenth Lok Sabha

Reference and notes

External links
Interview with Tejaswini Ramesh, Young champions of education in Parliament: Education World Magazine. 
 Home Page on the Parliament of India's Website

1966 births
Indian National Congress politicians from Karnataka
Living people
India MPs 2004–2009
Politicians from Bangalore
Lok Sabha members from Karnataka
Bharatiya Janata Party politicians from Karnataka
21st-century Indian women politicians
21st-century Indian politicians
Indian women television journalists
Indian television journalists
Journalists from Karnataka
Women members of the Lok Sabha
21st-century Indian women writers
21st-century Indian journalists
Writers from Bangalore
Women members of the Karnataka Legislative Assembly